The 2014–15 Missouri Tigers women's basketball team represents the University of Missouri in the 2014–15 NCAA Division I women's basketball season. The Tigers led by fifth year head coach Robin Pingeton, they play their games at Mizzou Arena and were members of the Southeastern Conference. They finished the season 19–14, 7–9 in SEC play to finish in a tie for seventh place. They lost in the second round of the SEC women's basketball tournament to Georgia. They were invited to the Women's National Invitation Tournament where they defeated Northern Iowa in the first round, Kansas State in the second round before getting defeated by Michigan in the third round.

Roster

Schedule and results

|-
!colspan=12 style="background:#F1B82D; color:#000000;"| Exhibition

|-
!colspan=12 style="background:#F1B82D; color:#000000;"| Non-conference regular season

|-
!colspan=12 style="background:#F1B82D; color:#000000;"| SEC regular season

|-
!colspan=12 style="background:#F1B82D;"| SEC Tournament

|-
!colspan=12 style="background:#F1B82D;"| WNIT

See also
 2014–15 Missouri Tigers men's basketball team

References

Missouri Tigers women's basketball seasons
Missouri
Missouri Tigers
Missouri Tigers